Shenton Hall is a 17th-century country house at Shenton, Leicestershire. It is a Grade II* listed building.

The  estate at Shenton was purchased in 1625 by William Wollaston (1581–1666) and he built the house in the Jacobean style of the day. The detached gatehouse,  also Grade II*, incorporates a date stone WW 1629

Wollaston and his son both served as High Sheriff of Leicestershire. On the latter's death in 1688, the estate passed to a cousin William Wollaston, writer and philosopher. The house was greatly extended to the rear in 1862.

The Wollastons occupied the house until 1940. During World War II the army took possession and the prisoners of war were accommodated on the estate.

References

 Heritage Gateway: architectural description of listed building
 Heritage Gateway: architectural description of Gatehouse
 A Genealogical and Heraldic History of the Commoners of Great Britain and Ireland Vol 3, p415 (1838) John Burke. Google Books

Houses completed in the 17th century
Grade II* listed buildings in Leicestershire
Country houses in Leicestershire